Valentin Jaroslav "Vilda" Loos (13 April 1895 in Prague, Austria-Hungary – 8 September 1942 in Prague, Bohemia and Moravia) was a Czechoslovak ice hockey player who competed in the 1920 Summer Olympics and in the 1924 Winter Olympics.

He was a member of the Czechoslovak ice hockey team that won the bronze medal in 1920. Four years later he also participated in the first Winter Olympic ice hockey tournament.

References

External links

Valentin Loos at Sports-Reference

1895 births
1942 deaths
Czech ice hockey right wingers
HC Slavia Praha players
Ice hockey people from Prague
Ice hockey players at the 1920 Summer Olympics
Ice hockey players at the 1924 Winter Olympics
Medalists at the 1920 Summer Olympics
Olympic bronze medalists for Czechoslovakia
Olympic ice hockey players of Czechoslovakia
Olympic medalists in ice hockey
People from the Kingdom of Bohemia
Czechoslovak ice hockey right wingers